The Battle of Deçiq was a battle between Albanian tribesmen and Ottoman forces during the Malësori uprising of 1911. It was a turning point for Albania's secession from the Ottoman Empire. Dedë Gjo Luli, the organiser of the Albanian tribal forces, raised the Albanian flag for the first time since 1479 on the mountain of Deçiq after the Albanians had achieved victory over the Ottoman Turks.

Location and Background
The battle took place in Deçiq, south of the town of Tuzi (in modern-day Montenegro), within Gruda tribal territory. Tuzi is the town center of the Malësia region in Montenegro, whereas the town center of Malësia E Madhe is Koplik. Malësia is simply translated to "The Highlands", referring to the rough mountainous terrain that characterizes the region. Malësia has primarily Roman Catholic faith, although it has a sizeable Muslim population (including Koplik itself). The tribesman of Malësia is known as Malësor, meaning Highlander.

The battle occurred during the Albanian Uprising of 1911, in which the Malësor tribes undertook multiple successful military actions against the Ottoman empire. During the first days of April, there was fighting around Dinosh-Deçiq. Reports at the time indicated that this force consisted of around 2,500 Malësor Albanian tribesmen, of which 900 belonged to the Gruda, 600 to the Kelmendi, 400 to the Hoti, 250 to the Shala, a small number to the Shkreli tribe and unknown numbers from Kastrati, Triepshi and Koja e Kuçit. The Ottomans had initiated the offensive, burning Vuksan Lekaj and attacking Humi, Deçiq, Tuzi, etc. The Hoti tribesmen in Helm managed to hold off the Ottomans, killing 25 soldiers, wounding roughly the same, and capturing 20 Ottoman Turks.

The Battle
The main portion of the battle took place between Tuzi and Koplik (in modern-day Albania), whereby 3,000-3,300 Malësors fought against 28,000 Ottoman soldiers. Koplik is the largest town in Malësia, right across the border with Montenegro is Tuzi. As the fighting proceeded, both armies decided to move north into Tuzi, where the battle ended.

The Ottomans had initially attacked Deçiq, which was protected by 600 Albanian tribesmen, with 6 battalions, 2 artillery units, and 9 machine guns. After 12 hours of battle, and 300 casualties on the Ottoman side, the Turks retreated to the castle of Shipshanik.

On the 6th of April, Dedë Gjo Luli raised the Albanian flag on the summit of Bratila in Deçiq. During this offensive, the Ottomans lost around 30 soldiers, whereas the Albanian tribesmen lost 7, one of which was the flagbearer Nish Gjelosh Luli. When raising the flag, Ded Gjo Luli said "Now, brothers, you will see that which no one has seen in 450 years...". This was the first time Albanians raised their Flag since the Castle of Shkodër had fallen in 1479. About a year and a half later, with the help of the Austro-Hungarian Empire, the Albanian Flag was officially raised in the southern town of Vlora, Albania.

The Hoti and Gruda tribes continued their offensives in Dinosh on 7–8 April, resulting in the recapture of positions lost during the first days of April. On the 13th of April, the combined efforts of Kelmendi, Shala, and Shkreli tribesmen in coordination with Hoti, Gruda, and Kastrati tribesmen led to the successful conquest of strategic positions in Deçiq and close to Tuzi. An Austro-Hungarian military report at the time claimed that the Albanian tribesmen had attacked Tuzi and the hills to the east, which were called Mali i Hotit (Mountains of Hoti).

Outcome
In 1913, at the Treaty of London, the powers of Europe decided to grant approximately half of Malësia to Montenegro while the rest were ceded to Albania. Tuzi, along with half of the Hoti (Traboini) tribal territory, all of Gruda, Triesh, and Koja e Kuçit went to Montenegro. Kelmendi, the other half of Hoti (Rapsha), Kastrati, Shkreli, and the town of Koplik remained in Albania, but certain parts of Kelmendi such as Vuthaj, Martinaj, Plav and Guci, went to Montenegro. Most of Kosovo was annexed to Serbia, with parts of the region of Metohija being ceded to Montenegro

Notable warriors
 Ded Gjo Luli Dedvukaj of Traboin
 Lulash Zeke Nicaj of Traboin
 Sokol Baci of Gruda
 Palok Marku Lulgjuraj of Gruda
 Zef miliqi Lulgjuraj of Selishti
 Prel Marku Lulgjuraj of Lofka
 Pretash Zeka Ulaj of Koja
 Prek Cali of Kelmend
 Dok Prëçi Krcaj of Koja
 Gjeto Toma Kolçaj of Koja
 Mehmet Shpendi of Shala
 Tringe Smajl Martini of Gruda
 Palok Traboini 1888-1951, Secretary of Ded Gjo Lul, teacher, and owner of the Albanian Flag of Deçiq, which he brought from Vienna through Dalmatia.

References

Further reading
 Martini, Luigj, 2005 "Prek Cali, Kelmendi Dhe Kelmendasit"  Publisher: Camaj-Pipaj
 Tallon, James  "The failure of Ottomanism: The Albanian Rebellions of 1909--1912" |url=http://gradworks.umi.com/35/26/3526980.html

Deciq
Conflicts in 1911
1911 in Albania
Deciq
Albanian rebellions
Albanian separatism
April 1911 events in Europe